Tiancun station is a station on Line 6 of the Beijing Subway. It was opened on December 30, 2018.

Station Layout 
The station has an underground island platform.

Exits 
There are 3 exits, lettered A, B, and D. Exit D is accessible.

Future plan 
The station will eventually connect with Line 3 In the second phase of the line.

Gallery

References

External links 
 Beijing Subway official map, showing official English name

Beijing Subway stations in Haidian District
Railway stations in China opened in 2018